Nokia Asha 308 is a mid range phone and the successor to the Nokia Asha 305. It was announced in September, 2012 and was released in October, 2012. The phone features dual-sim over the Wi-Fi feature seen in Nokia Asha 309.

See also
 List of Nokia products
 Comparison of smartphones

References 
 Nokia Asha 308 - Full phone specifications - http://www.gsmarena.com/nokia_asha_308-5010.php
 

Asha 306